Acrosanthes anceps is a species of plant from South Africa.

Description 
This sprawling shrublet has trailing branches. The fleshy leaves are lance-shaped end in an abruptly point and have a somewhat pointed base.

White flowers are present between September and November. They are solitary and grow from the nodes. Each flower has between 15 and 30 stamens.

Distribution and habitat 
This species is endemic to the Northern Cape and Western Cape of South Africa. It grows on stony sandstone slopes between Piketberg, Clanwilliam and Goudini.

References 

Plants described in 1862
Flora of South Africa
Aizoaceae